Vicente Díaz  is the Electoral Rector appointed by the National Assembly of the Bolivarian Republic of Venezuela on April 27, 2006. Díaz is one of the five main authorities regulating the electoral process, the only one who is openly politically independent from the current ruling political party. He has acted as Chairman of the Committee on Political Participation and Financing since 2006.

Díaz graduated magna cum laude with a degree in Sociology from the Central University of Venezuela and pursued graduate studies at the University of Zulia's Institute of Advanced Management Studies and Metropolitan University . He has held management positions in national and multinational companies in corporate divisions of Marketing, Human Resources and Total Quality. Vicente Díaz has served as vice president of the Cultural Association Maraven, Director of the Foundation for a miracle to Venezuela, and President of the National Tribute Foundation. Díaz has acted as a contributing writer for Venezuelan newspapers El Nacional, Notitarde and Quinto Día

References

Electoral branch of the Government of Venezuela
Living people
Venezuelan politicians
Year of birth missing (living people)
University of Zulia alumni